Oakley (Fife) railway station served the village of Oakley, Fife, Scotland from 1850 to 1986 on the Stirling and Dunfermline Railway.

History 
The station opened as Oakley on 28 August 1850 by the North British Railway. To the west was the goods yard and the private line to Forth Iron Works and Comrie Colliery. The station's name was changed to Oakley (Fife) on 9 March 1925. The goods yard was replaced in the 1950s with exchange sidings being laid. A signal box opened in 1954. The station closed to passengers on 7 October 1968.

References 

Disused railway stations in Fife
Railway stations in Great Britain opened in 1850
Railway stations in Great Britain closed in 1968
Beeching closures in Scotland
Former North British Railway stations
1850 establishments in Scotland
1986 disestablishments in Scotland